Ariel Rotter (born 1973 in Buenos Aires, Argentina) is a film director and screenplay writer.

He works in the cinema of Argentina.

Filmography
 Sólo por hoy (2001)  Just for Today
 The Other (2007) a.k.a. El Otro
 Incident Light (2015)

Awards
Wins
 Bogota Film Festival: Silver Precolumbian Circle; for Sólo por hoy; 2001.
 Fribourg International Film Festival: E-Changer Award - Special Mention;  for Sólo por hoy; 2001.
 Toulouse Latin America Film Festival: Audience Award; for Sólo por hoy; 2001.
 Berlin International Film Festival: Silver Bear, The Jury Grand Prix; 2007.

References

External links
 

1973 births
Argentine film directors
Argentine screenwriters
Artists from Buenos Aires
Male screenwriters
Argentine male writers
Living people
Writers from Buenos Aires